or  (Chinese: 株式會社滿洲映畫協會) was a Japanese film studio in Manchukuo during the 1930s and 1940s.

Background
Man'ei was established by the Kwantung Army in the occupied northeast part of China in 1937. Man'ei controlled the entire process of film production, as well as release and international distribution of Manchurian films. With its large-scale investment and capital, Man'ei mainly focused on producing political films, dramas, propaganda, and documentaries. Man'ei also expanded its film production across Japanese-occupied East Asia and exported these productions to Axis countries to achieve the goal of making Manchukuo a "Dream Land of Film Making". The company established relations with Japanese-controlled distribution networks and film studios. In 1939, Man'ei built a new studio with cutting-edge equipment; it also ran film schools from 1937 to 1944 which produced hundreds of alumni. The company’s size grew from employing 900 people in December 1940 to 1,800 by November 1944.

History
The original studios were located at a former wool goods factory, with the offices at the former Kitsurin Architectural Institute (吉林省建築設計院) in Kitsurin Province. Unlike Japan's film markets in Taiwan and Korea, Man'ei was promoted as being a Japanese-run Chinese film studio from its start. Man'ei grew out of the Southern Manchurian Railway's Photographic Division, which was initially charged with producing industrial and educational films about Manchukuo for Japanese audiences. Promotional materials from the studios boasted that Man'ei had the most state-of-the art facilities in all of Asia at that time. Negishi Kan'ichi was recruited from Nikkatsu's Tamagawa Studios to oversee feature film productions.

In 1939, Nobusuke Kishi enlisted Masahiko Amakasu, head of Manchukuo's Ministry of Civil Affairs, to replace Negishi. Amakasu effectively used his status as a film industry outsider, as well as his notoriety as the murderer of Osugi Sakae and family to maintain the Man'ei's independence from the mainland Japanese film industry. Amakasu was frequently critical and sometimes hostile to Japanese perceptions of Man'ei. As a result of a 1936 tour of Nazi Germany and Fascist Italy, Amakasu was able to see visit the studios Universum Film AG and Cinecittà. After taking up his post at Man’ei, Amakasu was determined to reform the studio's production system after UFA's in order to compete with both Hollywood and the Japanese film industry. This included using staff from the Towa Company to assist him in procuring the latest German movie cameras and production techniques. Amakasu also hosted notables from the Japanese film industry including movie stars, directors, and orchestral conductors such as Takashi Asahina. Although Amakasu was considered right-wing, he hired many left-wing and Communist sympathizers at a time when they were being purged from the Japanese film industry.

Amakasu is also credited with launching the career of the actress and singer Ri Kōran, whose real name was Yamaguchi Yoshiko. Chinese audiences regarded her as a Chinese girl, as she spoke fluent Mandarin. After the Pacific War, Ri Kōran returned to Japan, from where she later pursued a career in Hollywood.

Man'ei distinguished itself from other Japanese colonial film studios. Amakasu maintained that his primary audience was not Japanese, but Manchurian. In a 1942 article entitled "Making Films for the Manchurians," Amakasu stated: "There is absolutely no need to make films that exoticize Manchukuo for Japan. Japan will probably make their own films that get it wrong anyhow, vulgarizing the unusual aspects of Manchuria. We must not forget that our focus is the Manchurians and, after we make headway, nothing should keep us from producing films for Japan."

Following the Soviet invasion of Manchukuo and subsequent chaos surrounding the surrender of Japan, Man'ei collapsed. The Soviet Red Army looted its equipment and Masahiko Amakasu committed suicide by taking poison. In August 1945, the Communist Party of China and the Kuomintang fought over the rights to the former company. By April 1946, the Communist Party of China officially took control of Man'ei's assets and merged it with the Northeast Film Studio. They were later consolidated into the Changchun Film Studio, making it a turning point of movie production in the People's Republic of China.

Films and publications
At its peak, Man'ei became the largest and most technologically advanced film studio in Asia. Various features were made and released to the Greater East Asia Co-Prosperity Sphere.

Modernization was the central theme of both educational and entertainment films. Although most of Man'ei's films were destroyed on the orders of the Japanese military, the American military managed to retrieve a number of them. They stored these documents in the National Archive and Records Administration after the Japanese surrender in 1945.

According to a 1939 survey of educated Manchurian viewers, Man'ei films were found to be dull and implausible, reflecting little knowledge of real life in Manchukuo. In response, Man'ei strived to produce high-quality dramas. Educational films continued to occupy a large proportion of Man’ei's productions. Later, the company decided to utilize a new method, which combined familiar elements of life with an imperial ideology in order to reach a propagandistic goal. 

Man'ei established a film magazine entitled , and its first publication was in December 1937, in Japanese and Chinese versions. These included serialized novelizations of Man'ei films and entertainment news. Manshū eiga also published film criticism, although domestic scholars always complained about the quality of Manei's production.  However, Amakasu responded, "the films of [Man’ei] are primarily targeted at the uncultured masses... We must treat and educate them like children, and explain things to them slowly and in plain language."

Legacy
Man’ei is controversial in the history of Chinese cinema since its works are viewed in China as pro-Japanese propaganda.

About half of the Association's film archives were lost to the Soviets in the aftermath of World War II.  In May 1995, Japan repurchased the films that were in the lost segment.  Initially a Japanese company packaged the films in 30 episodes to be sold in Japan at 300,000 yen.  The Chinese government lodged an official complaint about the legitimacy of the matter, since the government of the People's Republic of China claims copyright ownership of any of the former works of Manchukuo, and the films were reproduced without China's consent.  Japan agreed to give some works back as compensation.  Some are preserved today in China's National Film Archives, others are preserved in the Changchun Film Studio.

See also
 Cinema of China
 Cinema of Japan

Notes

References

 

Chinese film studios
Japanese film studios
Companies in Manchukuo
Defunct companies of China
Defunct companies of Japan
Defunct companies of Manchukuo
Changchun Film Studio
1937 establishments in China
1937 establishments in Japan
1937 establishments in the Japanese colonial empire
Mass media companies established in 1937
Mass media companies disestablished in 1946
Imperial Japanese Army
State-owned film companies